Goh Keng Swee  (6 October 1918 – 14 May 2010), born Robert Goh Keng Swee, was a Singaporean politician who served as Deputy Prime Minister of Singapore between 1973 and 1985. Goh is widely recognised as one of the founding fathers of Singapore. He was also one of the founders of the People's Action Party (PAP), which has governed the country continuously since independence.

Goh was a prominent member of the country's first generation of political leaders after Singapore became independent in 1965. He served as Minister for Finance between 1959 and 1965, and again between 1967 and 1970, Minister for Interior and Defence between 1965 and 1967, Minister for Defence between 1970 and 1979 and Minister for Education between 1979 and 1985.

As Minister for Interior and Defence, Goh's main objective was to strengthen the country's military and domestic security capabilities after the British had withdrawn its troops from the former British Crown colony, which made the newly-independent nation vulnerable. A key policy was the creation of National Service (NS), a mandatory conscription system for able-bodied young males. Prime Minister Lee Kuan Yew had mentioned that he wanted a conscription consisting both men and women however, Goh rejected it, citing that the labour cost would be too great for the newly-independent nation.

During Goh's tenure as Minister for Finance, he declined to allow the central bank to issue currency, favouring instead a currency board system as this would signal to citizens, academics and the financial world that governments cannot "spend their way to prosperity", the Monetary Authority of Singapore (MAS) was later established in 1971. 

In 1981, Goh also expressed the view that the central bank need not hold large amounts of cash in reserve to defend the currency, proposing that the Government of Singapore Investment Corporation be established to invest excess reserves. At the time, it was unprecedented for a non-commodity-based economy to have such a sovereign wealth fund. The foreign merchant bank, Rothschild, advised on the GIC.

Early life and career
Goh was born in Malacca on 6 October 1918 into a middle class Peranakan family, the fifth of six children. His father Goh Leng Inn, was a manager of a rubber plantation, while his mother Tan Swee Eng, was from the family that produced the Malaysian politicians Tan Cheng Lock and his son, Tan Siew Sin, who would later become Goh's lifelong political opponent.

Goh was given the Christian name Robert, which he disliked and refused to respond to. When he was two years old, his family moved from Malacca to Singapore where his maternal grandparents owned several properties. The Gohs later relocated to the Pasir Panjang rubber estate when his father found work there, and became manager in 1933. In common with many Peranakan families, the Gohs spoke both English and Malay at home; church services were held at home on Sundays in Malay. Goh's father Leng Inn and the latter's brothers-in-law Chew Cheng Yong and Goh Hood Keng taught in the Anglo-Chinese School for various periods, and were also involved in the Middle Road Baba Church while Hood Keng was pastor there. Goh attended the church as well.

Goh attended the Anglo-Chinese School between 1927 and 1936 where he was second in his class in the Senior Cambridge examinations, Goh graduated from Raffles College (now the National University of Singapore) in 1939 with a Class II Diploma in Arts with a special distinction in economics. 

After graduation, Goh joined the colonial Civil Service as a tax collector with the War Tax Department but, according to his superiors, was not very good at his job and was almost fired. Shortly after the start of Second World War, he joined the Singapore Volunteer Corps, a local militia, but returned to his previous work after the fall of Singapore. 

Goh married Alice Woon, a secretary who was a colleague, in 1942 and they have one son, Goh Kian Chee, two years later. In 1945, he relocated his young family to Malacca, but returned to Singapore the following year after the Japanese occupation ended. That year, he joined the Department of Social Welfare, and was active in the post-war administration. He became a supervisor of the Department's Research Section six months later.

Goh attained a scholarship which enabled him to further his studies at the London School of Economics. During his time in London, Goh met fellow students seeking independence for British Malaya, including Abdul Razak, Maurice Baker, Lee Kuan Yew and Toh Chin Chye. A student discussion group, the Malayan Forum, was formed in 1948 with Goh as the founding chairman. Goh graduated in 1951 with a first class honours in economics, and won the William Farr Prize for achieving the highest marks in statistics. Upon his return to the Department of Social Welfare, he was appointed Assistant Secretary of Research. In 1952, together with fellow civil servant Kenneth Michael Byrne, he formed the Council of Joint Action to lobby against salary and promotion policies that favoured Europeans over Asians. Byrne later became Minister for Labour and Minister for Law.

In 1954, Goh was able to return to the London School of Economics for doctoral studies with the help of a scholarship conferred by the University of London. He completed his PhD in economics in 1956, and returned to the Department of Social Welfare, where he served as Assistant Director and subsequently as Director. In 1958, he was appointed Director of the Social and Economic Research Division in the Chief Minister's Office. He resigned from the civil service in August that year to work full-time for the People's Action Party (PAP).

Political career

Pre-independence
Goh was a key member of the PAP's Central Executive Committee (CEC), and serving as Vice-Chairman. 

Goh contested in Kreta Ayer during the 1959 general election and won. He was subsequently elected into the Legislative Assembly on 30 May 1959, and appointed Minister for Finance under Prime Minister Lee Kuan Yew's first Cabinet. 

As Minister for Finance, Goh assumed the stewardship of Singapore's economy. As a budget deficit of S$14 million was forecast that year, he introduced stringent fiscal discipline which including cutting civil service salaries. As a result of these measures, he was able to announce at the end of the year when delivering the budget that the government had achieved a surplus of $1 million. 

Goh initiated the setting up of the Economic Development Board (EDB) which was established in August 1961 to attract foreign multinational corporations to invest in Singapore. The next year, he started the development of the Jurong industrial estate on the western end of the island which was then a swamp, offering incentives to local and foreign businesses to locate there. According to former Permanent Secretary Sim Kee Boon, Goh admitted that the Jurong project was "an act of faith and he himself jokingly said that this could prove to be Goh's folly". Nonetheless, Goh also felt strongly that "the only way to avoid making mistakes is not to do anything. And that... will be the ultimate mistake."

In the 1960s, there were great pressures from communist agitators working through Chinese-medium schools and trade unions. Divisions existed within the PAP as well, with a pro-communist faction working to wrest control of the party from the moderate wing, of which Goh and Lee Kuan Yew were key members. A key source of division was the issue of merger with Malaya to form a new state of Malaysia. Goh and his fellow moderates believed this was a necessary condition for Singapore's economic development because Malaya was a key economic hinterland; merger would also provide an alternate vision against communism for Singapore's Chinese majority. In July 1961, 16 members of the pro-communist faction broke away from the PAP to form the Barisan Sosialis, and captured control of the main trade unions.

Federation of Malaysia
The Singapore Government attained approval from Malaysian Prime Minister Tunku Abdul Rahman for a merger in 1961, with the Tunku being motivated by a desire to stabilise the security situation in Singapore, and notably to neutralise the perceived communist threat. Singapore merged with Malaya and the British Borneo states in 1963 to form the Federation of Malaysia. 

Merger, however, proved to be problematic for the Singapore leaders. There was a clash of fundamental principles, both political and economic, notably on the issue of Malay dominance. Communitarian violence in 1964 was inflamed in Singapore by Malay and Chinese activists. According to Lee Kuan Yew, Goh fought to protect Singapore's interests against the Federal Minister of Finance, his cousin Tan Siew Sin, "who was out to spite Singapore". Goh played a crucial role in orchestrating the subsequent secession of Singapore from the Federation on 9 August 1965.

After two difficult years, Lee asked him to negotiate with the Malaysian Deputy Prime Minister Tun Abdul Razak and Minister for External Affairs Ismail Abdul Rahman in July 1965 for Singapore to have a looser arrangement with Malaysia within the Federation. However, following the discussions, Goh decided on his own that it would be better for Malaysia and Singapore to have a clean break.

Post-independence

Minister for Interior and Defence (1965–1967) 

Upon the independence of Singapore in 1965, Goh relinquished his portfolio of Minister for Finance and became Minister for Interior and Defence in 1967, assuming responsibilities for strengthening Singapore's military and domestic security capabilities. A key policy was the creation of National Service, a mandatory conscription system for able-bodied young males.

Minister for Finance (1967–1970)
Goh served as Minister for Finance again between 1967 and 1970, during which he declined to allow the central bank to issue currency, favouring instead a currency board system as this would signal to citizens, academics and the financial world that governments cannot "spend their way to prosperity".

Minister for Defence (1970–1979)
On 11 August 1970, he was reappointed Minister for Defence.

Deputy Prime Minister (1973–1984)
On 1 March 1973, Goh was appointed Deputy Prime Minister concurrently with his other Cabinet portfolio. 

On 12 February 1979, Goh moved on from the Ministry of Defence to the Ministry of Education, where his Goh Report greatly influenced the development of Singapore's education system. He was described as both a key political and strategic leader responsible for the transformation of the system over 30 years from "fair" to "great", according to a November 2010 McKinsey report. He set up the Curriculum Development Institute, and introduced key policies such as religious education—subsequently discontinued and, in 1980, the channelling of students into different programmes of study according to their learning abilities, known as "streaming". Goh served two terms as Minister for Education, his first term ended in 1980, and his second following the 1980 general election from 1981 until his retirement in 1985. 

From 1 June 1980, he was redesignated First Deputy Prime Minister upon S. Rajaratnam being made Second Deputy Prime Minister, and served as Chairman of the Monetary Authority of Singapore until he stepped down from Parliament on 3 December 1984, at the age of 66. 

In a tribute to mark the occasion, Prime Minister Lee Kuan Yew wrote: "A whole generation of Singaporeans take their present standard of living for granted because you had laid the foundations of the economy of modern Singapore."

Other contributions

Government of Singapore Investment Corporation (GIC)
In 1981, Goh expressed the view that the central bank need not hold large amounts of cash in reserve to defend the currency, proposing that the Government of Singapore Investment Corporation (GIC) be established to invest excess reserves. At the time, it was unprecedented for a non-commodity-based economy to have such a sovereign wealth fund. The foreign merchant bank, Rothschild, advised on the GIC.

Defence Science Organisation (DSO)
In 1971, Goh put together the Electronic Warfare Study Group, a team of newly-graduated engineers who had excelled in their university studies that was headed by Tay Eng Soon, then a university lecturer. The group worked on Project Magpie, a secret project to develop Singapore's defence technology capabilities. In 1977, the group was renamed the Defence Science Organisation (DSO). Originally part of the Ministry of Defence, the organisation became a non-profit corporation called DSO National Laboratories in 1997.

Cultural, sports and recreational

Goh was also responsible for projects that sought to improve Singaporeans' cultural and leisure life, such as the Jurong Bird Park, Singapore Zoo and the Singapore Symphony Orchestra. 

He backed the construction of the Kreta Ayer People's Theatre in his constituency as a venue for Chinese opera performances. In 1968, Goh encouraged the establishment of the Institute of Southeast Asian Studies.

Goh was also instrumental in introducing rugby in the Singapore Armed Forces and later in schools. In recognition of his role in promoting the sport, the Schools "C" Division Cup is named after him. 

Impressed by an oceanarium in the Bahamas, he contacted the Sentosa Development Corporation and persuaded them to build an oceanarium in Singapore. Underwater World opened in 1991.

Personal life
In 1986, Goh divorced his first wife Alice. In 1991, he remarried his former Ministry of Education colleague Phua Swee Liang.

Goh suffered his first stroke in 1999, and a subsequent one in 2000 which affected the vision in his right eye. According to Goh's daughter-in-law Tan Siok Sun, the medical condition caused him to be withdrawn and became introverted. In July 2007, Tan published a biography titled Goh Keng Swee: A Portrait. Goh's second wife issued a statement claiming that Goh had not been consulted on the book and had indicated to her that he did not want any book to be written about him. "Therefore, the publication of this book is contrary to his wishes, and is a show of disregard and utmost disrespect to him." In an interview with The Straits Times, Tan said she did not start the dispute between Mrs. Goh and herself, nor did she wish to prolong it.

After retirement from politics, Goh continued to be active in public life, serving as Deputy Chairman of GIC between 1981 and 1994, Economic Adviser to the State Council of the People's Republic of China on Coastal Development and Adviser on Tourism in 1985, Deputy Chairman of the Monetary Authority of Singapore between 1985 and 1992, Chairman of the Singapore Totalisator Board between 1988 and 199), Director of Gateway Technologies Services Pte. Ltd. from 1991 onward, Adviser to the United Overseas Bank Group from 1993 onward, Chairman of N. M. Rothschild & Sons (Singapore) Ltd. from 1994 onward, and Vice-Chairman of Hong Leong Asia Ltd. from 1995 onward. 

Goh was also Chairman of the Board of Governors of the Institute of East Asian Philosophies between 1983 and 1992, which was founded to study Confucianism. The institute later turned its focus on China's political and economic development, renaming itself the Institute of East Asian Political Economy, and Goh continued as Executive Chairman and Chairman of the Board of Governors until 1995. In April 1997, the institute was reconstituted as the East Asian Institute, an autonomous research organisation under the auspices of the National University of Singapore.

Death
On 14 May 2010, Goh died in the early morning at his home in Dunbar Walk off East Coast Road in Siglap, at the age of 91. 

His body lay in state at Parliament House from 20 to 22 May, and there was a state funeral on 23 May 2010 at the Singapore Conference Hall followed by a private ceremony for family members at the Mandai Crematorium. 

The latter was conducted by the pastor-in-charge of Barker Road Methodist Church, with a message delivered by the Bishop of the Methodist Church in Singapore, Robert M. Solomon. As a mark of respect, State flags at all Government buildings were flown at half-mast from 20 to 23 May.

Honours
In 1966, Goh was made an Honorary Fellow of the London School of Economics. In 1972, he was the recipient of the Ramon Magsaysay Award for Government Services, which is often regarded as "Asia's Nobel Prize". It is awarded to people who have demonstrated integrity in government, courageous service to the people, and pragmatic idealism within a democratic society. That same year, the Philippine Government conferred upon him the Order of Sikatuna, which is given to diplomats, officials and nationals of foreign states who have rendered conspicuous services in fostering, developing and strengthening relations between their country and the Philippines.

Following his retirement from politics, in 1985 Goh was awarded the Order of Temasek (First Class), Singapore's highest civilian honour. He was also presented with the LSE's Distinguished Alumnus Award on 21 January 1989, and made the first Distinguished Fellow of the Economic Development Board Society in 1991.

During the National Day Rally on 29 August 2010, Prime Minister Lee Hsien Loong announced that the Singapore Command and Staff College, where senior officers of the Singapore Armed Forces receive training; and a complex to be constructed at the Ministry of Education's North Buona Vista Road headquarters for specialist teacher training academies in English language, physical education, sports and the arts would be respectively named the Goh Keng Swee Command and Staff College and the Goh Keng Swee Centre for Education.

Publications
.
.
.
.
.
.
. Later editions:
.
.
.
.
. Later edition:
.
.
.

Notes

References
.
.
.
.

Further reading

Books
.
.
.
.
.
.
.
.
.
.

Eulogies at the state funeral
; . See also .
. See also .
. See also .
. See also .
.

Letters of condolence
.
.
.

News reports
.
.
.
.
.
.

External links

, archived from the original on 1 April 2013
National Library Singapore – NLS Resource guide on Dr. Goh Keng Swee

|-

|-

1918 births
2010 deaths
Alumni of the London School of Economics
Anglo-Chinese School alumni
Deputy Prime Ministers of Singapore
Finance ministers of Singapore
Chairmen of the Monetary Authority of Singapore
Malaysian emigrants to Singapore
People who lost Malaysian citizenship
Naturalised citizens of Singapore
Members of the Parliament of Singapore
Members of the Dewan Rakyat
Members of the Legislative Assembly of Singapore
National University of Singapore alumni
Recipients of the Darjah Utama Temasek
People's Action Party politicians
Singaporean politicians of Chinese descent
Singaporean Methodists
Singaporean people of Hokkien descent
Peranakan people in Singapore
Honorary Fellows of the London School of Economics
N M Rothschild & Sons people
Ministers for Defence of Singapore
Chiefs of Defence Force (Singapore)
Ministers for Education of Singapore
Deaths from bladder cancer
Deaths from cancer in Singapore